Donald Macpherson Baillie (1887 – 1954) was a Scottish theologian, ecumenist, and parish minister.

Life 
Raised in the Calvinist tradition, Baillie studied at University of Edinburgh and then at the University of Marburg, where he was influenced by the theologian Wilhelm Herrmann. After some time as a Church of Scotland parish minister, he wrote Faith in God and its Christian Consummation (1927). This led to his appointment as a professor of divinity at St Mary's College, University of St Andrews, where he spent the remainder of his life.

His only other, and more famous, work was God was in Christ (1948), which explored the paradox of grace, and applied it to incarnational theology.

He was the brother of Scottish theologian John Baillie (1889-1960).

1887 births
1954 deaths
Scottish Calvinist and Reformed theologians
20th-century Ministers of the Church of Scotland
Alumni of the University of Edinburgh
Academics of the University of St Andrews
20th-century Calvinist and Reformed theologians